After Everything (also known as Eternal Love (UK); originally titled Shotgun) is a 2018 American comedy-drama film written and directed by Hannah Marks and Joey Power. It stars Jeremy Allen White, Maika Monroe, DeRon Horton, Sasha Lane, Dean Winters, Gina Gershon and Marisa Tomei. When Elliot, a brash 23-year-old living carefree in New York City, meets the sensible Mia and receives a damning diagnosis all in the same week, his world is turned completely upside down. But as their love blossoms amidst the chaos of his treatment, they discover that Elliot's illness is not the real test of their relationship – it's everything else.

It had its world premiere on South by Southwest on March 9, 2018. It was released on October 12, 2018, by Good Deed Entertainment, to positive critical reception.

Cast
 Jeremy Allen White as Elliott
 Maika Monroe as Mia
 DeRon Horton as Nico
 Sasha Lane as Lindsay
 Joe Keery as Chris
 Gina Gershon as Tracy
 Bill Sage as Paul
 Marisa Tomei as Dr. Lisa Harden
 Dean Winters as Blake
 Olivia Luccardi as Janelle
 Callie Thorne as Celia
 Rya Kihlstedt as Rebecca
 Marlyne Barrett as Dr. Beatty
 Peter Vack as Young Cancer Survivor
 Sendhil Ramamurthy as David
 Lizzy DeClement as Vanessa
 Ana Isabelle as Eliott's Ex

Production
In March 2017, it was announced Jeremy Allen White and Maika Monroe, had been cast in the film, with Hannah Marks and Joey Power directing from a screenplay they wrote. Jordan Yale Levine, Jordan Beckerman, Michael J. Rothstein, Ash Christian, Sean Glover and Wei Wang are producing the project, under their Yale Productions and WYSJ Media banners, respectively. In April 2017, Sasha Lane joined the cast of the film.

Filming
Principal photography began on April 3, 2017, in New York City.

Release
The film had its world premiere at South by Southwest on March 9, 2018. Shortly after, Good Deed Entertainment acquired distribution rights to the film. It was released on October 12, 2018.

Critical reception 
After Everything received positive reviews. On Metacritic, the film scored 67 out of 100, based on 11 critics, indicating "generally favorable reviews".

References

External links
 

2018 comedy-drama films
2018 films
2018 independent films
American comedy-drama films
American independent films
Films directed by Hannah Marks
Films shot in New York City
2018 directorial debut films
2010s English-language films
2010s American films